Harry Stradling Jr. (January 7, 1925 – October 17, 2017) was a two-time Oscar-nominated American cinematographer and the son of cinematographer Harry Stradling.

Early years
Stradling was born in Yonkers, New York.

Career
He worked on four Blake Edwards films and six films by Burt Kennedy. (See: List of film director and cinematographer collaborations). He was acclaimed in particular as a skilled cinematographer in Westerns. He was nominated for two Oscars, for 1776 and The Way We Were, and for a Primetime Emmy for George Washington. He also did cinematography on 87 episodes of Gunsmoke, and shot 21 of the total 23 episodes of the TV show Cimarron Strip.

Stradling's work on Westerns, including both Gunsmoke and Cimarron Strip as well as feature films including the 1969 Western comedy Support Your Local Sheriff! (1969), brought him to the heavily filmed Iverson Movie Ranch in Chatsworth, Los Angeles, California, where he has been cited as one of the most adept cinematographers of his era when it came to capturing the unique cinematic attributes of the location's massive sandstone boulders.

Oscar nominations
Both of Stradling's nominations came in the category of Best Cinematography:

45th Academy Awards-Nominated for 1776. Lost to Cabaret.
46th Academy Awards-Nominated for The Way We Were. Lost to Cries and Whispers.

Filmography
(Note: This list includes only films on which Stradling was the director of photography and/or credited cinematographer. He also was uncredited on a number of films and received a number of credits as camera operator.)

Caddyshack II (1988)
Blind Date (1987)
A Fine Mess (1986)
George Washington (1984)
Micki + Maude (1984)
O'Hara's Wife (1982)
Buddy Buddy (1981)
The Pursuit of D.B. Cooper (1981)
S.O.B. (1981)
Carny (1980)
Up the Academy (1980)
Prophecy (1979)
Born Again (1978)
Convoy (1978)
Go Tell the Spartans (1978)
Damnation Alley (1977)
The Greatest (1977)
The Big Bus (1976)
Midway (1976)
Special Delivery (1976)
Bite the Bullet (1975)
Mitchell (1975)
Rooster Cogburn (1975)
Bank Shot (1974)
McQ (1974)
Nightmare Honeymoon (1974)
The Man Who Loved Cat Dancing (1973)
The Way We Were (1973)
1776 (1972)
Skyjacked (1972)
Thumb Tripping (1972)
Fools' Parade (1971)
The Late Liz (1971)
Something Big (1971)
Support Your Local Gunfighter (1971)
Dirty Dingus Magee (1970)
Little Big Man (1970)
There Was a Crooked Man... (1970)
The Good Guys and the Bad Guys (1969)
The Mad Room (1969)
Support Your Local Sheriff! (1969)
Young Billy Young (1969)
With Six You Get Eggroll (1968)
Welcome to Hard Times (1967)
Synanon (1965)

References

External links

Harry Stradling Jr. at the Iverson Movie Ranch
 Iverson Movie Ranch: History, vintage photos.

1925 births
2017 deaths
American cinematographers
Artists from New York City